Pyrrolostatin is a lipid peroxidation inhibitor with the molecular formula C15H21NO2 which has been isolated from the bacterium Streptomyces chrestomyceticus.

References

Further reading 

 
 

Streptomyces
Pyrroles
Carboxylic acids